Xhemal Aranitasi (aka Xhemal Araniti; 1886 in Aranitas, Mallakastër District, Fier County, Ottoman Empire, modern Albania, then  — 1961 in Turkey) was a general and commander in chief of the Royal Albanian Army.

He was the son of Ibrahim Aranitasi, an army colonel of the Ottoman Empire and Esma Jahobegaj. He graduated from the Monastir Military High School (now in modern North Macedonia), and then at the military academy in Istanbul, Turkey.

During the Balkan wars he fought in the Ottoman army, as the leader of a machine gun unit.

During World War I, when most of the territory of Albania was invaded by the Austro-Hungarian Army, he served in the Aranitas municipality as a commander of the gendarmerie.

In 1920 he joined the Royal Albanian Army and four years later he was a battalion commander. In 1925, with the rank of lieutenant colonel, he became the general commander of the Royal Albanian Army. Although major decisions on the Army were taken by officers of foreign origin, such as Gustav von Myrdacz and Leon Ghilardi, Aranitasi was the only native Albanian nominally on the staff. In 1929 he was promoted to general. He served as aide-de-camp of Zog I of Albania before this task was taken by Mehmet Konica.

In 1939, as minister of war, in the face of war with the Kingdom of Italy, Xhemal Aranitasi forbade the press publication of popular mobilization and also prohibited the issuing of weapons to the civilian population. On April 6, 1939, on the eve of the invasion of Albania by the Royal Italian Army, Aranitasi left the country and settled in Turkey, where he lived until the end of his life.

He was awarded the Grand Ribbon of the Order of Skanderbeg.

See also
Royal Albanian Army

Sources

1886 births
1961 deaths
19th-century Albanian people
20th-century Albanian military personnel
Albanian generals
Monastir Military High School alumni
Ottoman Military Academy alumni
Ottoman military personnel of the Balkan Wars
People from Janina vilayet
People from Mallakastër
Recipients of the Order of Skanderbeg (1925–45)
Royal Albanian Army